The Hiding Place is a 378-page fiction mystery book by David Bell. This novel was published October 2, 2012 by New American Library, an imprint of Penguin Books USA.

Plot 
The Hiding Place starts off at a park in the small town of Dove Point, Ohio where Janet Manning and her younger brother Justin Manning are sent to play alone. Janet loses track of her brother while playing with her own friend, she left him playing in the sandbox. When it's time to leave Justin has gone missing, no one is able to find him. Everyone has their own idea of how he went missing; he was chasing a dog and left the park in the direction of the forest. Or he was carried away by a man named Dante Rogers, an African American pedophile.

2 months after Justin Manning had gone missing, a boy's body was found in the forest outside of the park. They assumed this body belonged to 4 year old Justin, but they did not have the technology at the time to be completely sure.

Dante Rogers went to jail for 20 years for the murder of Justin Manning. The police arrested and charged him as he had photos of children in his room. One of these children was of a blonde child, Justin Manning.

Now, 25 years after Justin went missing, Janet is now 32 and she isn't sure what happened that day at the park. She meets a suspicious man, who looks like her brother, when he comes to her home one night. After the strange meeting with this man, she decides to try and find out what really happened to Justin.

Janet is not the only one searching for answers. Ashleigh Manning, Janet's 16-year-old daughter wonders what happened to her uncle. One night she heard a sound at the door, and listened into a conversation between her mother and a strange man. She digs more into this man and finds out his name; Justin manning. But Justin Manning is dead.

Main Characters 
 Janet: the protagonist. She is a woman who has goe through many hardships in her life; from having her mom die after her brother, to being a single mom. She is 32 with brown hair and dark eyes, the complete opposite of her brother. She is described as looking younger than she is. Janet is always looking over her shoulder after she moves back to Dove Point with her daughter to take care of her unemployed father, Bill Manning who doesn't want to acknowledge the death of his son. She prefers not to be interviewed about her brother's disappearance and death, yet she allows it every few years. When it comes to her family she is very protective of them and hopes that they can all one day come to terms to the effects of Justin's death.
 Ashleigh: she always rushes head first into something, only briefly thinking about the consequences. She feels that she cannot talk about Justin around her family or friends as it either causes them grief or burdens them. In her hunt for answers she falls alone, only telling anyone what she finds after she is assaulted when looking for proof about the man at the door. Ashleigh starts off as a reckless character but throughout the novel transforms into a mature girl with detective like instincts.
 Detective Stein: one of the original detectives on the case. He finds himself unable to put it down as he ventures into his retirement years. Detective Stein continues to chase down leads that they had when Justin went missing. He is the character who checks in with the Manning family and Dante Rodgers throughout the novel. Janet finds him to be like a grandfather to her.

Reception 
Publishers Weekly list of bestselling novels in the United States in the 2010s wrote, “An artfully constructed tale that charts the devastating, life-changing effects over twenty-five years on the people most effected by the murder of a four-year-old … a powerful, provocative novel.”

Bowling Green Daily News writes, “A gem of a book… Bell has written another winning thriller that is certain to entertain, frighten and swiftly climb bestseller lists”

Suspense Magazine wrote, “David Bell does a masterful job of crafting a crime story, with the guilty and innocent existing right next to each other, whether they realize it or not. He has also created tense drama of emotions and relationships.it is a riveting book with surprising but believable twists on every page.”

References 

2012 American novels
American mystery novels
New American Library books